
Gmina Jordanów Śląski is a rural gmina (administrative district) in Wrocław County, Lower Silesian Voivodeship, in south-western Poland. It is part of the Wrocław metropolitan area.

Neighbouring gminas
Gmina Jordanów Śląski is bordered by the gminas of Borów, Kobierzyce, Kondratowice, Łagiewniki and Sobótka.

Villages
The gmina contains the villages of Biskupice, Dankowice, Glinica, Janówek, Jezierzyce Wielkie, Jordanów Śląski, Mleczna, Piotrówek, Popowice, Pożarzyce, Tomice, Wilczkowice and Winna Góra.

References

Jordanow Slaski
Wrocław County